Trauma most often refers to:

Major trauma, in physical medicine, severe physical injury caused by an external source
Psychological trauma, a type of damage to the psyche that occurs as a result of a severely distressing event
Traumatic injury, sudden physical injury caused by an external force, which does not rise to the level of major trauma

Trauma may also refer to:

People
Trauma (wrestler)
Trauma II (born 1982), Mexican luchador enmascarado, or masked professional wrestler

Arts, entertainment, and media

Films
Trauma (1962 film), an American film by Robert M. Young
Red Rings of Fear (1978), a film sometimes known as Trauma
Trauma (1993 film), a horror film by Dario Argento
Trauma (2004 film), a psychological thriller by Marc Evans

Music

Groups and record labels
Trauma (American band), an American heavy metal band
Trauma (German band), a German trance band
Trauma (Polish band), a Polish death metal band
Trauma Records, a record label

Albums
Trauma (DJ Quik album), 2005
Trauma (I Prevail album), 2019

Songs
"Trauma", by Ayumi Hamasaki from A and Loveppears, 1999
"Trauma", by Doja Cat, 2014
"Trauma", by Exo from Love Shot, 2018
"Trauma", by NF from The Search, 2019
"Trauma", by PartyNextDoor from Partymobile, 2020
"Trauma", by Seventeen from Teen, Age, 2017
"Trauma", by SF9 from Rumination, 2021
"Trauma", by Snovi from Ciklus, 2014
"Day Twelve: Trauma", by Ayreon from The Human Equation, 2004

Periodicals
Trauma (journal), a quarterly peer-reviewed medical journal
Trauma, Violence, & Abuse, a peer-reviewed academic journal that covers research

Television
Trauma (Canadian TV series), a 2010 medical drama set in Montreal
Trauma (American TV series), a 2009 medical drama set in San Francisco
Trauma (British TV series), a 2018 miniseries set in London

Other uses in arts, entertainment, and media
Trauma (comics), a character associated with Avengers: The Initiative in the Marvel Universe
Trauma (novel), a 2008 novel by British author Patrick McGrath
Trauma (video game), a 2011 graphic adventure game
Trauma Center (video game series), a surgical-based video game
Trauma Studios, an American computer game development company

Medicine
Dental trauma, trauma to the teeth and/or gums and/or nearby soft tissues
Trauma team, a multidisciplinary group of healthcare workers who collectively work together
Traumatic alopecia, a cutaneous condition that results from the forceful pulling out of the scalp hair
Traumatic anserine folliculosis, a curious gooseflesh-like follicular hyperkeratosis
Traumatic bone cyst, a condition of the jaws
Traumatic neuroma, a type of neuroma which results from trauma to a nerve, usually during a surgical procedure
Traumatology, scientific study of injuries caused by external sources

Sports
Los Traumas, a Mexican professional wrestling tag team

See also
Beautiful Trauma, an album by Pink
Troma Entertainment, film company specializing in independent, horror, and exploitation films